Blue Deckert is an American actor known for his roles in film and television. A native of Daisetta, Texas, Deckert has had supporting roles in Dallas, Walker, Texas Ranger, Friday Night Lights, The Event, and others.

Filmography

Film

Television

References 

Living people
1951 births
Male actors from Texas